The Bouroum Department is a department or commune of Namentenga Province in northern Burkina Faso. Its capital lies at the town of Bouroum.

Towns and villages
 Bouroum (capital)

References

Departments of Burkina Faso
Namentenga Province